L. niloticus may refer to:
 Labeo niloticus, the Nile carp, a fish species distributed along the entire Nile valley
 Lates niloticus, the Nile perch, a freshwater fish species found in Africa